Mount Izla ( Ṭūr Īzlā' ),  also Mountain of Nisibis or briefly in the 9th century Mount Kashyari, is a low mountain or ridge near Nisibis in what once was Sassanid Persia, but is now southeastern Turkey, along the border with Syria.  The ridge is the location of dozens of ancient monasteries which were built in the early centuries of Christianity.  In modern times, all of the monasteries are in ruins except for that of Mor Melke reconsecrated in the 1930s, Mor Yakub Monastery, founded in Dibek in 2012–2013, and the Monastery of Mor Augin which was refounded in 2008 after being abandoned in the 70's.

Though called a mountain, it is actually a  ridge running from east to west, with a plateau on the northern (Turkey) side, and a plain on the southern (Syria) side. One end of the ridge is Dara, a Roman fortification.  On the other is Serwan (Sisaranon), the location of the Castle of Tur Abdin, which was built by Constantius II in the 4th century.

Early monasteries, believed to have been founded in the 4th century, are Mar Awgin, Mar Malke, and Mar Samuel. The next was the most famous, Mar Abraham of Kashkar, also known as the Great Monastery, which was founded in the latter part of the 6th century.  Later monasteries included that of Rabban Sapra, Mar Yaret, Mar Khudahwi, Za'faran (Saffron), Mar Yohannan the Arab, and Mar Ya'qob.  At its peak, there were approximately 40,000 monks on Mt. Izla.

Notable residents
 Abraham the Great of Kashkar
 Dadisho of Mount Izla
 Babai the Great

References

External links
 

Geography of Mardin Province
Christian monasteries in Turkey
Izla